Kvinnherad is a municipality in Vestland county, Norway. It is located in the traditional district of Sunnhordland, along the Hardangerfjorden. The municipality was the 5th in size in former Hordaland county.

The administrative centre of the municipality is the village of Rosendal. The largest village is Husnes, with about 6,000 people living in or near the village. Other villages include Ænes, Åkra, Dimmelsvik, Eidsvik, Hatlestrand, Herøysund, Høylandsbygd, Ølve, Sæbøvik, Sundal, Sunde, Uskedal, and Valen.

The  municipality is the 104th largest by area out of the 356 municipalities in Norway. Kvinnherad is the 94th most populous municipality in Norway with a population of 13,017.

In the southern part of Kvinnherad you will find the typical fjord landscape of western Norway. The areas of Mauranger and Rosendal are said to have about the most beautiful fjord landscape of Hardanger as a whole: narrow fjords, wild water-falls, and the nearby Folgefonna, the third biggest glacier in Norway.

General information

The parish of Qvindherred was established as a municipality on 1 January 1838 (see formannskapsdistrikt law). On 1 January 1907, a small area northwest of the villages of Ølve and Husa (population: 67) was transferred from neighboring Tysnes municipality to Kvinnherad. During the 1960s, there were many municipal mergers across Norway due to the work of the Schei Committee. On 1 January 1965, the following areas were merged into one large municipality of Kvinnherad:
All of Skånevik municipality located north of the Skånevikfjorden-Åkrafjorden and west of the Åkra area (population: 1,189)
All of Fjelberg municipality (population: 2,308)
All of the old Kvinnherad municipality (population: 5,831)
All of Varaldsøy municipality, except for the Mundheim area, (population: 511)

On 1 January 2013, the southwestern part of the Folgefonna peninsula (south of Kysnesstranda) was transferred from Kvinnherad to the neighboring Jondal municipality.

Name
The Old Norse form of the name was Kvinnaherað. The first element may be derived from the word tvinnr which means "double" (referring to the two rivers running through Rosendal, the administrative centre of the municipality). The last element is herað which means "district" or "municipality". The municipality name has been spelled several ways throughout history. Before 1889, the name was written "Quindherred", then from 1889 to 1917 it was "Kvinnherred", and since 1918 it has been spelled "Kvinnherad".

Coat of arms
The coat of arms was granted on 18 June 1982. The arms show the confluence of two blue rivers into one on a white or silver background. The rivers symbolize the many streams and rivers in the municipality, especially the Hattebergselvi and the Melselvi, that come together just before they run into the sea at Rosendal.

Churches
The Church of Norway has nine parishes within the municipality of Kvinnherad. It is part of the Sunnhordland prosti (deanery) in the Diocese of Bjørgvin.

Economy
The economy of Kvinnherad is based on the rich water resources within its boundaries. This includes power production, aluminium production (Sør-Norge Aluminium), fish farming, shipbuilding (Eidsvik Skipsbyggeri, Hellesøy Verft, Bergen Group Halsnøy), and lifeboat production (Umoe Schat-Harding, Norsafe, Eide Marine Tech, Noreq). These industries are spread throughout the municipality.

Kvinnherad has two local newspapers, Kvinnheringen and Grenda, as well as a local TV channel, TV Sydvest.

Government
All municipalities in Norway, including Kvinnherad, are responsible for primary education (through 10th grade), outpatient health services, senior citizen services, unemployment and other social services, zoning, economic development, and municipal roads. The municipality is governed by a municipal council of elected representatives, which in turn elect a mayor.  The municipality falls under the Haugaland og Sunnhordland District Court and the Gulating Court of Appeal.

Municipal council
The municipal council of Kvinnherad is made up of 35 representatives that are elected to four year terms. The party breakdown of the council is as follows:

Mayor
The mayors of Kvinnherad (incomplete list):
2019–present: Hans Inge Myrvold (Sp)
2015-2019: Peder Sjo Slettebø (H)
2007-2015: Synnøve Solbakken (Ap)
2003-2007: Bjarne Berge (LL)
1995-2003: Aksel Kloster (Ap)

Notable people 

 Axel Gyntersberg (ca.1525 – 1588 in Kvinnherad) a Norwegian nobleman and feudal overlord
 Johannes Lauritsson (ca.1540 – ca.1620) wealthy Norwegian landowner, lived Valen 1563-1578
 Axel Rosenkrantz (1670 in Kvinnherad – 1723) landowner and baron, owned the Barony Rosendal
 Andreas Lavik (1854–1918) a revivalist, temperance advocate, magazine editor, farmer, headmaster and politician; lived in Kvinnherad from 1885, where he was Mayor for eight years 
 Jens Tvedt (1857 in Kvinnherad – 1935) a Norwegian novelist and writer of short stories
 Gisle Midttun (1881 in Kvinnherad – 1940) a Norwegian cultural historian and museologist
 Olav Midttun (1883 in Mauranger – 1972) a philologist, biographer and magazine editor
 Ragnvald Vaage (1889 in Husnes – 1966) a Norwegian poet, novelist and children's writer
 Sigurd Valvatne DSO DSC (born 1913 in Kvinnherad) a naval officer and submariner
 Frank Meidell Falch (1920 in Kvinnherad – 2013) a Norwegian media director and politician
 Egil Myklebust (born 1942 in Kvinnherad) a businessperson and lawyer, CEO of SAS Group
 Lars Amund Vaage (born 1952 at Sunde) novelist 
 Endre Hellestveit (born 1976 in Rosendal) a Norwegian actor  
 Hans Inge Myrvold (born 1985) a Norwegian politician, Mayor of Kvinnherad in 2019
 Erlend Bratland (born 1991 in Husnes) a Norwegian singer, won Norske Talenter 2008

Geography

The municipality is located along the large Hardangerfjorden, mostly on the southeast side of the fjord on the Folgefonna peninsula, but also a small part on the other side. It includes several notable islands in the fjord including Varaldsøy, Fjelbergøya, Borgundøya, and Halsnøya.

The large Folgefonna National Park, which surrounds the Folgefonna glacier, is partially located in Kvinnherad. The northern part of the municipality is often referred to as Mauranger. It is the area surrounding the Maurangsfjorden. The notable Bondhusbreen glacier is located just south of that fjord, near the village of Sundal. The Jondal Tunnel and Folgefonna Tunnel both connect Mauranger with neighboring Odda and Jondal by cutting through the large mountains surrounding Mauranger.

The municipality has many large lakes including Blådalsvatnet, Juklavatnet, and Onarheimsvatnet. Many of these lakes are utilized for hydroelectric power generation.

Tourism and places of interest
Kvinnherad is a popular tourist location because of its natural landscape as well as several places of interest. The most notable of which include Kvinnherad Church, the Bondhusbreen glacier, the shipping mural in Høylandsbygd, and Radiohola. Rosendal, the administrative centre of the municipality, is the site of the greatest tourist attraction in Kvinnherad: the Barony Rosendal. The Barony is the only one of its kind in Norway. It is a museum, which offers valuable information about the Union with Denmark, an important period of Norwegian history. It was one of the locations of the 1958 film "The Vikings" starring Kirk Douglas, Tony Curtis, Janet Leigh and Ernest Borgnine. Many of the citizens of Kvinnherad/Hardanger, Norway were used as extras.

Media gallery

References

External links
 Municipal fact sheet from Statistics Norway 
 http://www.kvinnherad.kommune.no 
 http://www.baroniet.uio.no 
 Kvinnheradguiden.no 
 Kvinnheringen.no 
 Grenda.no 
 Innsida.no 
 Husnes Ungdomsskule 

 
Municipalities of Vestland
1838 establishments in Norway